The New Cairo British International School (NCBIS) is a British International school in New Cairo, Cairo Governorate, Egypt.

It was established in 1978 by a group of parents, most of whom were connected with the World Health Organization (WHO). The school has operated since that time as a "not-for-profit organisation" under the auspices of the Heliopolis Society for the Cultural and Social Care of English Speaking Foreigners ('The Society'), and is managed through a board of directors "elected" from amongst the parent community.

The school continues to operate as an international institution offering a British-style and IB-enriched curriculum.

References 

 The Good School Guide for Expats 
 Council of International Schools (CIS)
 A Bridge to Egypt 
 International Education Directory 
World News

External links 

 

Schools in New Cairo
International schools in Greater Cairo
British international schools in Egypt
International Baccalaureate schools in Egypt
Private schools in Egypt
Educational institutions established in 1978
1978 establishments in Egypt